Birling is a village and civil parish in the Tonbridge and Malling district of Kent, England, about seven miles west of Maidstone.  According to the 2001 census it had a population of 430 increasing to 437 at the 2011 Census: 224 male and 213 female. It is south-west of the nearby town of Snodland and 37 miles away from the capital.

Toponymy 
The origin of the name 'Birling' is unclear, some sources believe that it signifies 'Bærla's family' with the 'ing' portion of the word coming from the Old English '-ingas' suffix meaning family or followers. Other sources mention Birling and other place names with similar spellings with the definition: 'place of the descendants of the cup-bearer or butler'.

The Village 
The village of Birling is home to few general commodities due to its size. However it is home to Children's House Montessori School, which was previously the village school. Another one of Birling's notable buildings is the Nevill Bull pub, whose name derives from the Nevill family that have owned land in the area for hundreds of years. The parish itself is only 680 hectares with much of the area being pasture grounds, it lies at the foot of the chalk, Birling Hills.

All Saints Church (Church of All Saints) 
Situated at the north end of the village, All Saints church, is mentioned in the Doomsday book although many sources say that the main aisles and nave were actually built 300 years later in the 14th century. The chancel was rebuilt in the 16th century by the Nevill family. The church became a grade 1 listed building in 1959.

Transport 
Despite being a rural village, Birling is relatively well connected to its local settlements due to Maidstone being in close proximity. It is on the Addington to Maidstone bus route and although it does not have a train station, the nearest is less than 3 miles away in West Malling.

History 
Although there is no mention of the village of Birling pre-Norman Conquest, it features in the Doomsday Book which was written in 1086. At the time it was written, there were 30 households, 12 acres of meadow and pasture 50 cattle. It also mentions the All Saints church, but major developments on the building were made around 400 years later. Around this time, a vast proportion of Kent and the surrounding areas was in possession of Odo of Bayeux, Earl of Kent. Odo was the half brother of William the Conqueror.

In the 1870s, Birling was described as:A parish in Malling district, Kent; adjacent to the river Medway, 2¾ miles WSW of Snodland r. station, and 6 NW of Maidstone. It has a post office under Maidstone. Acres, 1,883. Real property, £3,277. Pop., 662. Houses, 111. The property is subdivided.

Occupation Structure in 1881 
In 1881 a large number of people who lived in the village of Birling worked in agriculture due to the large amount of pasture ground and meadow. The majority of working women had occupations based around domestic services, food and dress however, a large proportion of women were unemployed or had unspecified jobs. There was also only one police officer in the village. This structure tallies with other villages in Britain at this time due to the lack of variation in job opportunities.

The Nevill Family 
The Nevill family have been prevalent in Birling's history as they have been in possession of Birling Estate since 1435. The family acquired the Estate when Elizabeth, daughter of Richard Beauchamp, Earl of Worcester married Sir Edward Nevill. The estate has remained in the family since, coming up to 600 years later. The family also had royal ties, with Queen Elizabeth I being recorded as coming to visit Henry Nevill in Birling as part of her travels in 1573.

Population 
The population of Birling has changed quite drastically in the last 200 years, however the population of the village is currently 437 which is only 66 more than in 1801 (371). Although this does not seem like a big change over a 200-year period, the population has fluctuated a lot in that time. The highest population count was in 1891 at 1384 inhabitants which is close to putting Birling in the category of 'town' rather than 'village'. A population graph for Birling since 1800 shows 2 distinct peaks which seem anomalous with the rest of the graph which shows a general rise up to the 1930s and then a slow decline to the current day.

In terms of population structure in the village, it is similar to that of the rest of the country, the majority of people are in the economically active category. However Birling has a higher mean and median average age (40.3 and 42) than the rest of the country (39.3 and 39).

References

External links

Villages in Kent
Civil parishes in Kent